Katan, Hebrew for small, may refer to:

People
Yaniv Katan (born 1981), Israeli footballer
Brother Katan

Other
Zakef katan, a Torah trope sound, anchor for Katan group
Mo'ed Katan, Jewish holiday
Olam katan, Jewish philosophical concept
Tallit katan, Jewish garment
HaMakhtesh HaKatan, Israel

See also
 Catan
 Katana